Burundi–Turkey relations are the foreign relations between Burundi and Turkey. Turkey has an Embassy in Bujumbura since December 2018, and Burundi's Embassy in Ankara opened in June 2014.

Diplomatic Relations 

The relationship between Turkey and Burundi has been very limited until 2000. Turkey has been an importer of Burundi's coffee and has offered some international aid and assistance.

During the Cold War, and especially in the 1960s, relations between Turkey and Burundi cooled because of the latter's relationship with communist China. However, this was very short-lived and relations improved later. Relations soured following the 1972 massacre. In 2000, relations became closer when Turkish diplomatic corps strongly supported Arusha Accords.

Economic Relations 
 Trade volume between the two countries was 3.1 million USD in 2019 (Turkish exports/imports: 2.6/0.5 million USD).

See also 

 Foreign relations of Burundi
 Foreign relations of Turkey

References

Further reading 

 “L’Engrenage de la Violence au Burundi.” Revue Française d’Études Politiques Africaines 9 (July 1973): pp. 48–69. 
 Bacamurwanko, J. “Burundi: Which Way Out? (Perspective of the Crisis).” Washington, D.C., 1994. 
 Botte, Roger. “Burundi: De Quoi Vivait l’État.” Cahiers d’Études Africaines 22, nos. 3–4 (1988): pp. 277–317. 
 Bourgeois, R. Banyarwanda et Barundi. 3 vols. Brussels: Académie Royale des Sciences Coloniales, 1954–1957. 
 Gildea, R. Y., and A. Taylor. “Rwanda and Burundi.” Focus 13, no. 6 (February 1993).
 Hakizimana, Deo. Burundi: Le Non-dit. Geneva: Éditions Remesha, 1992. 
 Mworoha, Emile. Histoire du Burundi. Paris: Hatier, 1987. 
 Morris, Roger, et al. Passing By: The United States and the Genocide in Burundi, 1972. Washington, D.C.: Carnegie Endowment for International Peace, 1993.
 Mpozagara, Gabriel. La République du Burundi. Paris: Éditions Berger-Levrault, 1999.
 Ould-Abdallah, Ahmedou. Burundi on the Brink, 1993–1995. Washington, D.C.: United States Institute of Peace Press, 2000.

Burundi–Turkey relations
Turkey
Bilateral relations of Turkey